Adelmar Tavares da Silva (Recife, February 16, 1888 – June 20, 1963 Rio de Janeiro) was a lawyer, magistrate, jurist, professor and poet from Recife.  He was a member of Brazilian Societies devoted to criminology and law. As a poet he was respected with several of his poems becoming songs. In 1948 he became President of the Academia Brasileira de Letras.

Partial bibliography
 Luz dos meus olhos, Myriam - poetry (1912)
 A poesia das violas - poetry (1921)
 Noite cheia de estrelas - poetry (1925)
 A linda mentira - prose (1926)
 O caminho enluarado - poetry (1932)
 A luz do altar - poetry (1934)

External links
Academia (In Portuguese)

1888 births
1963 deaths
Brazilian poets
20th-century Brazilian lawyers
Brazilian academics
Members of the Brazilian Academy of Letters
People from Recife